Bruce Gerald Woloshyn (born March 22, 1964 in North Battleford, Saskatchewan), son of Gerry & Phyllis Woloshyn. He is a digital effects artist and supervisor.

Television credits
His visual effects television credits include 
Andromeda
Dark Angel
The Guard
Highlander: The Series
Millennium
 The Outer Limits (1995 TV series)
The pilot to Smallville
Stargate Atlantis
Stargate SG-1

Film credits
His feature film credits include 
Abraham Lincoln: Vampire Hunter
Antitrust
G.I. Joe: Retaliation
Into the Storm
Invictus
Let's Be Cops
The Lizzie McGuire Movie
Man on a Ledge
Metallica Through the Never
Mission to Mars
Night at the Museum
Power Rangers
Ratchet & Clank
RED 2
RoboCop
San Andreas
28 Weeks Later
3000 Miles to Graceland
The Judge
Trick 'r Treat
The Twilight Saga: Breaking Dawn – Part 1
The Twilight Saga: Breaking Dawn – Part 2
The Uninvited
Vacation (2015 film)

References

External links

1964 births
Living people
People from North Battleford
Northern Alberta Institute of Technology alumni